The Martin–Schultz scale is a standard color scale commonly used in physical anthropology to establish more or less precisely the eye color of an individual; it was created by the anthropologists Rudolf Martin and Bruno K Schultz in the first half of the 20th century. The scale consists of 20 colors (from light blue to dark brown-black) that correspond to the different eye colors observed in nature due to the amount of melanin in the iris (in this case, the lower the number, the lighter the eye color):

1-2: blue iris (1a, 1b, 1c, 2a : light blue iris - 2b: darker blue iris)
3:  blue-gray iris
4: gray iris (4a, 4b)
5: blue-gray iris with yellow/brown spots
6: gray-green iris with yellow/brown spots
7: green iris
8: green iris with yellow/brown spots
9-10-11: light-brown and hazel  iris
12-13: medium brown iris
14-15-16: dark-brown and black iris

See also
Eye color 
Martin scale
Human eye

References

Biological anthropology
Color scales
Eye color